The Principia College Historic District is a National Historic Landmark District encompassing the central portion of the campus of Principia College in Elsah, Illinois.  The campus master plan, as well as eleven of its buildings, are important late designs of architect Bernard Maybeck, best known for his influential architecture in the American West. The Principia was declared a National Historic Landmark in 1993, and was also placed on the National Register of Historic Places that same year.

Description and history
The Principia was founded by Mary Kimball Morgan in 1898 as an educational institution primarily serving the needs of Christian Scientists.  Beginning with primary and secondary schools, the organization (unaffiliated with the Church of Christ, Scientist but operating with its approval) established Principia College in the early 20th century. Initially based in St. Louis, Missouri, the organization in the 1910s began to search for a suitable campus location for the college.  A former country estate overlooking the Mississippi River just south of Elsah was purchased, and college president Frederic E. Morgan hired West Coast architect, Bernard Maybeck, to develop the campus master plan and buildings.  Maybeck used the existing roads on the estate as a foundation, and laid out what resembles an English country village.

The centerpiece of the campus is the chapel, which was the first permanent building of the campus. It was built in 1931-34 in Maybeck's conception of an American Colonial Revival structure, with a limestone exterior.  Most of the other buildings Maybeck designed have steel frames and use concrete extensively inside, but have exteriors of stone, brick, and timbering.  In the later phases of the campus construction, the onsite work was supervised by Henry Gutterson, who also contributed designs for several of the buildings. One architectural oddity on the campus is what is called the "Mistake House", which was used as a design and materials test vehicle by Maybeck.

See also
List of National Historic Landmarks in Illinois
National Register of Historic Places listings in Jersey County, Illinois

References

External links
 

Geography of Jersey County, Illinois
National Historic Landmarks in Illinois
Principia College
Historic districts on the National Register of Historic Places in Illinois
National Register of Historic Places in Jersey County, Illinois